Gymnandrosoma is a genus of moths belonging to the family Tortricidae.

Species
Gymnandrosoma aurantianum Lima, 1927
Gymnandrosoma cryptotortanum Adamski & Brown, 2001
Gymnandrosoma desotanum Heinrich, 1926
Gymnandrosoma gonomela (Lower, 1899)
Gymnandrosoma leucothorax Adamski & Brown, 2001
Gymnandrosoma linaresensis Adamski & Brown, 2001
Gymnandrosoma punctidiscanum Dyar, 1904
Gymnandrosoma trachycerus Forbes, 1931

See also
List of Tortricidae genera

References

External links
tortricidae.com

Grapholitini
Tortricidae genera